Bob Stull (born November 21, 1945) is a retired American college athletics administrator and former college football player and coach.  He is the former athletic director at the University of Texas at El Paso (UTEP), a position he held from 1998-2017. Stull served as head football coach at the University of Massachusetts Amherst, (1984–1985), UTEP (1986–1988), and the University of Missouri (1989–1993), compiling a career college football record of 46–65–2.

Early life and playing career
A native of Davenport, Iowa, Stull was a three-year letterman at Kansas State University, where he earned bachelor's and master's degrees.

Coaching career
Stull began his coaching career at Dubuque Senior High School in Dubuque, Iowa. He was the offensive line coach at Kent State from 1971 to 1974 under Don James. He then followed James to Washington, where he was receivers coach (1975–1978) and later offensive coordinator (1979–1983).

After two seasons at Massachusetts, Stull was hired at UTEP, where he posted a 21–15 record from 1986 to 1988, culminating in a 10–2 record and an appearance in the 1988 Independence Bowl. Stull didn't fare as well at the University of Missouri, compiling a 15–38–2 record in five seasons. While at Missouri, he coached on the losing end of the infamous "Fifth Down Game".

Administrative career
After his coaching career, Stull was director of the Girls and Boys Clubs of Seattle before entering administration at the University of Washington. He rejoined UTEP as athletic director after a 10-year absence. On August 31, 2017, Stull announced his retirement as UTEP's athletic director after 19 years at the helm.

Head coaching record

References

1945 births
Living people
Kansas State Wildcats football players
Kent State Golden Flashes football coaches
Missouri Tigers football coaches
UTEP Miners athletic directors
UTEP Miners football coaches
UMass Minutemen football coaches
Washington Huskies football coaches
University of Missouri faculty
High school football coaches in Iowa
Sportspeople from Davenport, Iowa
Sportspeople from Dubuque, Iowa
Coaches of American football from Iowa